Snow Hill is a town and the county seat of Worcester County, Maryland, United States. The population was 2,103 at the 2010 census. It is part of the Salisbury, Maryland-Delaware Metropolitan Statistical Area.

History
The town received its first charter on October 26, 1686, and was made a port of entry in 1694.

In 1742, Worcester County was carved out of the eastern half of old Somerset County and Snow Hill, centrally located in the new county and at the head of navigation on the Pocomoke River, was made the county seat.

Major fires in 1844 and 1893 destroyed the center of Snow Hill, including two successive Court Houses, although some eighteenth century structures survived both fires. Following the second fire, much of the commercial area was rapidly rebuilt, so the downtown today contains many historic buildings of the late nineteenth and early twentieth centuries.  The Snow Hill Historic District, which includes approximately 80% of the town, was created in 2002.

In December 2010, a Snow Hill businessman started a petition to remove the town's incorporation and revert the area to county control. The reasons given were lower county taxes, better services provided to the town, and a need for revitalization. The push was abandoned in January, 2011.

The All Hallows Episcopal Church, Chanceford, Old Friendship United Methodist Church, Samuel Gunn House, Makemie Memorial Presbyterian Church, James Martin House, Nassawango Iron Furnace Site, Nun's Green, George Washington Purnell House, and Gov. John Walter Smith House are listed on the National Register of Historic Places.

Geography
Snow Hill is located at  (38.175024, -75.390738).

Demographics

2010 census
As of the census of 2010, there were 2,103 people, 871 households, and 557 families residing in the town. The racial makeup of the town was 57.0% White, 39.0% African American, 0.2% Native American, 1.3% Asian, 0.3% from other races, and 2.2% from two or more races. Hispanic or Latino of any race were 1.6% of the population.

There were 871 households, of which 31.3% had children under the age of 18 living with them, 36.7% were married couples living together, 21.9% had a female householder with no husband present, 5.3% had a male householder with no wife present, and 36.1% were non-families. 32.0% of all households were made up of individuals, and 16% had someone living alone who was 65 years of age or older. The average household size was 2.32 and the average family size was 2.90.

The median age in the town was 44.7 years. 23.2% of residents were under the age of 18; 7.9% were between the ages of 18 and 24; 19.3% were from 25 to 44; 29.4% were from 45 to 64; and 20.2% were 65 years of age or older. The gender makeup of the town was 45.9% male and 54.1% female.

2000 census
As of the census of 2000, there were 2,409 people, 862 households, and 555 families residing in the town. The racial makeup of the town was 56.00% White, 42.34% African American, 0.08% Native American, 0.58% Asian, 0.04% Pacific Islander, 0.37% from other races, and 0.58% from two or more races. Hispanic or Latino of any race were 1.08% of the population.

There were 862 households, out of which 28.3% had children under the age of 18 living with them, 40.6% were married couples living together, 20.2% had a female householder with no husband present, and 35.5% were non-families. 31.4% of all households were made up of individuals, and 15.7% had someone living alone who was 65 years of age or older. The average household size was 2.37 and the average family size was 2.94.

In the town, the population was spread out, with 21.0% under the age of 18, 9.3% from 18 to 24, 29.6% from 25 to 44, 20.5% from 45 to 64, and 19.5% who were 65 years of age or older. The median age was 39 years. For every 100 females, there were 99.4 males. For every 100 females age 18 and over, there were 95.5 males.

The median income for a household in the town was $29,730, and the median income for a family was $38,657. Males had a median income of $25,439 versus $20,625 for females. The per capita income for the town was $15,560. About 14.8% of families and 15.9% of the population were below the poverty line, including 19.5% of those under age 18 and 13.1% of those age 65 or over.

Education

Snow Hill is the location of:
 Snow Hill Elementary School
 Snow Hill Middle School
 Snow Hill High School
 Cedar Chapel Special School

Religion

A number of Protestant religious denominations have churches in Snow Hill; several are listed on the National Register of Historic Places:
 All Hallows Episcopal Church
 Makemie Memorial Presbyterian Church
 Bates Memorial United Methodist Church
 Whatcoat United Methodist Church
 Ebenezer United Methodist Church
 Snow Hill Christian Church
 Liberty Church on the Rock Ministries
 Old School Baptist Church
 Mt. Zion Baptist Church
 Hutt's Memorial United Methodist Church

Notable people

 Arch Johnson, stage, film, and television actor died in Snow Hill in 1997.
 Judy Johnson, was a player in the Negro Baseball Leagues and later a scout in the major leagues.  In 1975, Johnson was inducted into the Baseball Hall of Fame.  He was born William Julius "Judy" Johnson in Snow Hill on October 26, 1900.
 Sherron Mills, professional basketball player, 1971-2016
 John Walter Smith, Congressman for Maryland 1st District, 1899–1900; 44th Governor of Maryland, 1900–1904; U.S. Senator, 1907-1919.  Born in Snow Hill on Feb 5, 1845.
 Ben Tate, NFL running back, who attended Snow Hill HS during his senior year in 2006; led team to the Maryland state championship game.
 R. V. Truitt, first lacrosse coach at the University of Maryland, 1919–1927. Founder of the Chesapeake Biological Laboratory in Solomons, MD (1925), now part of the University of Maryland Center for Environmental Science. World renowned marine ecologist who studied blue crab and oyster.
 Ephraim King Wilson II, U.S. Senator, 1885–1891; Congressman for Maryland 1st District, 1873-1874.  Born in Snow Hill on December 22, 1821.

Snow Hill in popular culture
In 1999, some scenes of the Hollywood film, Runaway Bride (starring Julia Roberts and Richard Gere) were shot at the Snow Hill High School. The scenes at the baseball and football games were filmed behind the school.

At the end of each episode of Adult Swim's "Children Hospital," is an old advertisement for The Corddry Co Snow Hill, MD.  Seen after the final credits.  The lead actor, writer, and producer is comedian Rob Corddry, whose father is from Snow Hill. He uses the advertisement as his  production banner.

See also
 Julia A. Purnell Museum
 Furnace Town Living Heritage Museum
 Mt. Zion One Room School

References

External links
 
 Town of Snow Hill website

English-American culture in Maryland
Towns in Maryland
Towns in Worcester County, Maryland
County seats in Maryland
1686 establishments in Maryland
Salisbury metropolitan area